When Knights Were Bold is a 1936 British musical comedy film directed by Jack Raymond and starring Jack Buchanan, Fay Wray and Garry Marsh. Songs include "Let's Put the People To Work" sung by Jack Buchanan, "Onward We Go" sung by Buchanan & soldiers' chorus, and "I'm Still Dreaming" sung by Buchanan.

Plot
Sir Guy de Vere inherits his father's estate while serving with the British army in India. He returns home to take up his new role, but is greeted with hostility by his family and servants. After a drunken evening, a bump on the head with a suit of armour sends Sir Guy back to the 1400s and the golden age of chivalry.

Cast
 Jack Buchanan as Sir Guy De Vere
 Fay Wray as Lady Rowena
 Garry Marsh as Brian Ballymoat
 Kate Cutler as Aunt Agatha
 Martita Hunt as Aunt Esther
 Robert Horton as Cousin Bertie
 Aubrey Mather as The Canon
 Aubrey Fitzgerald as Barker, butler
 Robert Nainby as Whittle, the 'boy'
 Moore Marriott as The Tramp
 Charles Paton as The Mayor

Production
The film was made at British and Dominions Elstree Studios by the independent Capitol Film production company. Buchanan had recently left his contract with producer Herbert Wilcox with whom he had enjoyed a number of hit releases. It was based on the 1906 play When Knights Were Bold  by Harriett Jay. The film's sets were designed by the art director Wilfred Arnold. Some scenes were shot on location at Warwick Castle.

Critical reception
In 1936, The Daily Express wrote, "In spite of its laudable effort to put more action into a fairly static play, the film script is a rare triumph of unimaginativeness." In 1942, The New York Times wrote, "it is, to state it briefly, a pointless trifle, a minor vaudeville skit...If the Little Carnegie is anxious to show none but British product, why doesn’t it play in revival some really memorable films? We can think of two dozen British pictures such as The Ghost Goes West, South Riding, To the Victor and Drums, not to mention the Hitchcock classics, which most certainly retain their appeal. Why expose a blunder which had better be forgot?" ; while more recently, TV Guide noted, "it seems that the best British farces come from mocking that land's rather stuffy customs. This picture takes that course and provides pleasing comedy by not taking itself seriously."

References

External links

Bibliography
 Low, Rachael. Filmmaking in 1930s Britain. George Allen & Unwin, 1985.
 Wood, Linda. British Films, 1927-1939. British Film Institute, 1986.

1936 films
1936 musical comedy films
Films directed by Jack Raymond
Films set in England
Films set in India
Films shot in England
Films shot at Imperial Studios, Elstree
British black-and-white films
British musical comedy films
1930s English-language films
1930s British films